Nikita Vassiljev (born 7 October 2003) is an Estonian professional footballer who currently plays as a midfielder for Meistriliiga club FCI Levadia and the Estonia national team.

International career
Vassiljev made his senior international debut for Estonia on 8 January 2023, in a 1–1 draw against Iceland in a friendly.

Honours

Club
Nõmme United
Esiliiga B: 2019

References

External links

2003 births
Living people
Sportspeople from Tartu
Estonian footballers
Estonian people of Russian descent
Association football midfielders
FC Nõmme United players
FCI Levadia U21 players
FCI Levadia Tallinn players
Esiliiga B players
Esiliiga players
Meistriliiga players
Estonia youth international footballers
Estonia under-21 international footballers
Estonia international footballers